Dodge Street is the main east–west street in Omaha, Nebraska. Numbered as U.S. Route 6 (US 6), the street starts in Downtown Omaha and connects to West Dodge Road just west of 78th Street. From there, it continues westward through the remainder of Douglas County.

About

Dodge Street was named for influential Iowa Senator Augustus C. Dodge. Dodge was a strong supporter of westward expansion beyond the Missouri River to the Pacific Ocean who originally introduced the bill which led to the Kansas-Nebraska Act. Sources frequently erroneously list the street's namesake as Grenville Dodge, the chief engineer for the Union Pacific Railroad. Six miles of Dodge were paved with macadam in June 1894; however, by 1917 citizens were circulating a petition for the road to be graded.

Dodge Street serves as the dividing point between North and South street addresses in Omaha. The street features reversible lanes from 30th Street to 69th Street to accommodate commuter traffic in and out of downtown. From the late 1950s through the late 1980s Dodge Street from 60th through 80th Streets was the main strip for cruising in Omaha. The City of Omaha ended this practice in the early 1990s, when it enacted a law prohibiting U-turns from 8pm to midnight.

Route

Dodge Street begins as a westbound one-way offramp from I-480 right after it crosses the Missouri River from Iowa. Traveling through Downtown Omaha, this stretch begins the route of the former Lincoln Highway in Omaha. Along it are several buildings listed on the National Register of Historic Places, including the Kirschbraun and Sons Creamery, Inc. at 901 Dodge Street, The Logan at 1804 Dodge Street, and the Simon Brothers Company at 1024 Dodge Street. The street was once lined by the Old Post Office. Accommodating U.S. 6 it conjoins with Douglas Street at 30th Street to hold five lanes of two-way traffic.

At approximately 45th Street the 1934 Saddle Creek Underpass takes Saddle Creek Road under Dodge Street. It is included on the Bridges in Nebraska Multiple Property Submission. Dundee is a historic neighborhood in Midtown Omaha centered near 50th and Dodge Streets. Originally a separate city, Dundee was annexed by Omaha in 1915. The University of Nebraska Omaha and Crossroads Mall are located at 72nd and Dodge Streets.

West Dodge Road
West Dodge Road is one of the main east–west streets in West Omaha. Beginning immediately west of 78th Street, the main six-lane road curves northwest, aligning itself with Cass Street. At this point Dodge Street itself continues up the hill (between Methodist Hospital and Children's Hospital) and terminates at 84th Street.

West Dodge Expressway
Before Westroads Mall and the Regency community, West Dodge Road becomes a controlled-access freeway at 96th Street (eastbound, stop lights do not begin until 90th), with an elevated local-express lane segment from I-680 through 132nd Street. The West Dodge freeway travels west by Boys Town and Elkhorn.  

At 204th Street (Nebraska Highway 31), U.S. 6 exits to turn south towards Gretna and the freeway becomes Nebraska Link 28B. At 240th Street, the freeway turns north towards Fremont as part of U.S. Route 275.

Exit List

History
Omaha's Capitol Hill was originally located at the intersection of 20th and Dodge, at the building where the Nebraska Territory legislature convened. The steep grade of Dodge Street was reduced from 12% to 7% in the 1920s, dramatically altering the face of the grounds surrounding Omaha Central High School. The original Boys Town was opened on West Dodge Road in 1921, and the Joslyn Art Museum opened at 26th and Dodge in 1931. Omaha's notable Saddle Creek Underpass was built to facilitate traffic along Dodge Street by the Works Progress Administration in 1934. The Memorial Park Pedestrian Bridge was completed in 1968.

The expressway was opened in 2006.

See also
 
 Transportation in Omaha

References

External links 
 Dodge Street - Looking west on Dodge Street from 30th Street in 1889

Streets in Omaha, Nebraska
U.S. Route 6